2002 Euler is a stony background asteroid from the inner regions of the asteroid belt, approximately  in diameter. It was discovered on 29 August 1973, by Russian astronomer Tamara Smirnova at the Crimean Astrophysical Observatory in Nauchnyj, and assigned the prov. designation . It was named after Swiss mathematician Leonhard Euler.

Orbit and characterization 

Euler is a non-family asteroid of the main belt's background population when applying the hierarchical clustering method to its proper orbital elements. It orbits the Sun at a distance of 2.3–2.6 AU once every 3 years and 9 months (1,373 days). Its orbit has an eccentricity of 0.07 and an inclination of 9° with respect to the ecliptic.

Naming 

This minor planet was named after Swiss mathematician, physicist and astronomer Leonhard Euler (1707–1783). His contributions to astronomy included two theories for the motion of the Moon. Euler spent much of his time in St. Petersburg and was associated with the Russian Academy of Sciences. The official  was published by the Minor Planet Center on 15 October 1977.

Physical characteristics

Diameter and albedo 

According to the surveys carried out by the Infrared Astronomical Satellite IRAS, the Japanese Akari satellite, and NASA's Wide-field Infrared Survey Explorer with its subsequent NEOWISE mission, Euler measures between 14.49 and 19.773 kilometers in diameter and its surface has an albedo between 0.0416 and 0.0839. The Collaborative Asteroid Lightcurve Link adopts Petr Pravec's revised WISE-data, that is, an albedo of 0.0375 and a diameter of 19.78 kilometers with an absolute magnitude of 12.7.

References

External links 
 Lightcurve Database Query (LCDB), at www.minorplanet.info
 Dictionary of Minor Planet Names, Google books
 Asteroids and comets rotation curves, CdR – Geneva Observatory, Raoul Behrend
 Discovery Circumstances: Numbered Minor Planets (1)-(5000) – Minor Planet Center
 
 

002002
Discoveries by Tamara Mikhaylovna Smirnova
Named minor planets
Leonhard Euler
19730829